Roy Oliver may refer to:

 The police officer convicted in the murder of Jordan Edwards
 The second and long-time CEO of Pierce Biotechnology